is a mini-album by Japanese girl group Melon Kinenbi. It was released on December 12, 2007, and peaked at #67 on the Oricon weekly chart.

Track listing

This song was released as a single shortly after the album's release.

Solo by Megumi Murata

Solo by Masae Ohtani

Solo by Ayumi Shibata

Solo by Hitomi Saito

External links
Melon Juice at the Up-Front Works discography list (Japanese)

2007 albums
Melon Kinenbi albums